The Ems was a 1,829 ton, iron sailing ship with a length of , breadth of  and depth of .

History 
She was built by Charles Connell & Company, Glasgow for the Nourse Line, and named after the Ems River in north west Germany,  and launched on 6 April 1893. She was primarily used for the transportation of Indian indentured labourers to the colonies. Details of some of these voyages are as follows:

In 1898, she made a voyage from Bristol to Calcutta in 87 days and in 1902 arrived in Calcutta from New York in 102 days.

In 1910, the Ems was sold to Tønsberg Whaling Company of Norway. She was resold in 1912 to another Norwegian owner and refitted as a whaling and guano ship.

In 1916 she was sold to the Argentine Whaling Company, was renamed the Fortuna but kept her Norwegian crew. She was abandoned at sea with the loss of five lives.

See also 
 Indian Indenture Ships to Fiji

References

External links 
Genealogy.com
The Ships List

History of Suriname
Indian indenture ships to Fiji
Whaling ships
Guano trade
Shipwrecks of Ireland
Maritime incidents in 1927
Individual sailing vessels
Victorian-era passenger ships of the United Kingdom
Ships built on the River Clyde
Merchant ships of Norway
Merchant ships of Argentina
1893 ships